Joe Calzaghe versus Mikkel Kessler was a super middleweight boxing contest between the number one and two super middleweights in the World. At the time both fighters were unbeaten. On the line was the WBA (Undisputed), WBC, WBO, and The Ring championship. Calzaghe won by unanimous decision.

Build-up
Joe Calzaghe entered the contest having held the WBO version of the World super middleweight title for nine years, originally beating Chris Eubank for the vacant belt in 1997.  He had defended the belt a total of twenty times and had also briefly held the IBF version of the title following a victory over American Jeff Lacy.  In total Calzaghe was undefeated in 43 fights and was considered one of the best pound for pound fighters in the World.

Mikkel Kessler was the holder of both the WBC and WBA belts.  Originally winning the WBA belt in November 2004 with a victory over Manny Siaca.  He defended twice before taking on WBC champion Marcus Beyer in a unification bout in October 2006.  He defended both titles in his next fight against Librado Andrade in March 2007.  Kessler was considered to be second only to Calzaghe in the super middleweight division.

Talks had been held between the two camps for the fight since October 2006 after Kessler successfully defended against Andrade and Calzaghe had defeated Sakio Bika.  Kessler had complained that the Welshman spoke more about facing the likes of Bernard Hopkins and Roy Jones than face his nearest rival in the division. Eventually in July 2007 a fight was agreed for November with Calzaghe's promoter Frank Warren and Mogens Palle representing Kessler coming up with a suitable deal.  Speaking of the fight Calzaghe claimed that this was the fight that would mean the most to his career so far even more than the victories over Lacy and Eubank.

The fight

The fight was held at the Millennium Stadium in Cardiff in front of 50,000 fans and broadcast on the television networks HBO and Setanta Sports.  The first three rounds were closely fought before Kessler had the better of the 4th with two separate right uppercuts winning him the round. The following rounds saw Calzaghe's work rate begin to take control although Kessler seemed to have the advantage in terms of power with a number of shots seeming to rock Calzaghe further. According to Compubox at the end of the fight Calzaghe had thrown 1010 punches against 585 for Kessler although Kessler had the edge on accuracy and the number of power punches which landed. Speaking of the fight and the number of punches thrown Kessler said afterwards "his punches weren't particularly hard but it was confusing when he hit you 20 times." In the interview immediately after the fight, Kessler did admit that Calzaghe had hurt him with one particular body shot.

The decision meant that Calzaghe had been able to unify three belts in the division and fully establish himself as the top super middleweight in the World.

Aftermath
The fight with Kessler had been the 21st defense of Calzaghe's WBO title.  The achievement meant that the boxer was now in the record books as having made the 4th highest number of world title defenses.  Only the likes of Joe Louis (25 defenses), Dariusz Michalczewski (23 defenses) and Ricardo López (23 defenses) had achieved more in men's boxing. Calzaghe was awarded the BBC Sports Personality of the Year Award for his achievements in boxing throughout 2007.

Kessler regrouped by winning back the now vacant WBA title against Dimitri Sartison and defending it once against Danilo Haussler.

References

Boxing matches
2007 in boxing
Boxing in Wales
Sports competitions in Cardiff
2007 in Welsh sport
November 2007 sports events in the United Kingdom
2000s in Cardiff